Sarabotys is a genus of moths of the family Crambidae.

Species
Sarabotys cupreicostalis 
Sarabotys ferriterminalis Munroe, 1964

References

Natural History Museum Lepidoptera genus database

Pyraustinae
Crambidae genera
Taxa named by Eugene G. Munroe